American entertainer Britney Spears has released 47 music videos and ten video albums. She has appeared in several films, television shows, and commercials. Spears made her acting debut at age 11 in the television show The All-New Mickey Mouse Club (1993–1994), playing various roles. She then made her feature film debut in Longshot (2001) as a cameo, portraying a flight attendant. In 2002, she starred as Lucy Wagner in Crossroads. The film grossed $61 million worldwide and earned her a nomination for Best Female Breakthrough Performance at the 2002 MTV Movie Awards. The same year, she gave her voice to the character Donner in the American dubbing of Robbie the Reindeers television specials Hooves of Fire (1999) and Legend of the Lost Tribe (2002). In television series, she portrayed the guest roles of Amber-Louise and Abby in Will & Grace (2006) and How I Met Your Mother (2008), respectively. Spears also has released a few television documentaries, including Britney: For the Record (2008).

In 1998, Spears's first music video "...Baby One More Time", in which she chose to dress as a Catholic schoolgirl, propelled her to superstardom. It ranked number one on TRLs Final Countdown of the most iconic music videos. The music video for the lead single from Spears's second studio album, "Oops!... I Did It Again" (2000), was similarly successful. Set on Mars, Spears dons a tight-fitting red jumpsuit. The "Stronger" music video had a more sophisticated and adult feel to it. 2001's "I'm a Slave 4 U", from her eponymous third studio album Britney, let Spears move further into a more mature territory, performing a complicated dance routine in a risqué outfit.

"Me Against the Music", which featured Madonna, was released in 2003 from Spears's fourth studio release In the Zone. She came up with the storyline for "Toxic", directed by Joseph Kahn. Spears plays three different incarnations of herself and poisons her unfaithful lover. Throughout the video, there are scenes of her naked covered in diamonds. The music video for "Everytime", directed by famed photographer David LaChapelle, was darker than Spears's previous videos. Featuring religious references such as reincarnation, the music video was noted by contemporary critics for predicting her future struggles with fame. Spears made her directional debut with the music video for "Do Somethin'" (2005), credited as her alter ego "Mona Lisa". She co-directed it with Bille Woodruff, who previously worked with her in "Born to Make You Happy" (1999) and the original version of "Overprotected" (2002). The music video for the 2007 lead single "Gimme More", from her fifth studio album Blackout, displayed Spears as a stripper and featured a break from her highly choreographed music videos. "Piece of Me" referenced Spears's life at the time, while "Break the Ice" was accompanied by an animated music video showing Spears as a superheroine.

2008's "Womanizer", from her sixth studio album Circus, was seen as a return to form for Spears. Described as a sequel to "Toxic", the concept was again pitched to director Kahn by Spears. The video for "Circus" portrayed Spears as the ringmaster of a circus accompanied by different performers, and it is interspersed with scenes of Spears in different circus settings. "If U Seek Amy" saw Spears at a sex party that takes place at her house, before she transforms into a typical American housewife, while "Radar" pays tribute to Madonna's "Take a Bow" (1994). The music video for "3" (2009) was described as "simple" and "very, very minimal."
The music videos from Spears's seventh and eighth studio albums, Femme Fatale (2011) and Britney Jean (2013), respectively, have all received acclaim from critics and fans alike. She also got credit from critics and fans for her video for "Slumber Party", from her ninth studio album Glory, both released in 2016. It was favourably compared to the videos of "I'm a Slave 4 U" and "Boys" (2002).

Over the years, various music videos of Spears have been hailed for their major impact on pop culture and are deemed amongst the most influential music videos of all time. At the 2011 MTV Video Music Awards, she was honored with the Michael Jackson Video Vanguard Award, presented to her by Lady Gaga, who said "the industry would not be the same without her". Spears ranked at four on VH1's 50 Greatest Women of the Video Era list, ahead of most of her contemporaries and behind only veterans such as Madonna, Janet Jackson, and Whitney Houston. In 2020, Billboard ranked her eight on its 100 Greatest Music Video Artists of All Time list.

Music videos

1990s

2000s

2010s–2020s

Video albums

Filmography

Film

Television

Executive producer

Video games

Commercials

See also
 Britney Spears discography

Notes

References 

Actress filmographies
Videography
Videographies of American artists
American filmographies